The Hebrew Free Loan Society of New York, founded in 1892, is the oldest money gemach in the United States. It spawned similarly named free-loan funds in many other cities, including Washington, D.C.; Philadelphia, Pennsylvania; and Holyoke, Massachusetts.

Using money provided by contributions, the society provides small, interest-free loans which are paid back in weekly installments. Today, the society provides more than $10 million in interest-free loans on an annual basis while maintaining a loss rate lower than one percent.

See also
International Association of Hebrew Free Loans

Jewish community organizations
Organizations based in New York City
1892 establishments in New York (state)